Bongkoj Khongmalai, nickname "Tak" (born 15 April 1985), is a Thai actress, model and producer.

Career 
Films she has appeared in include Tom-Yum-Goong. She portrayed a young Thai woman forced into prostitution in Australia who comes to the aid of the film's hero, Tony Jaa. Alternate spellings of her name include Bongkot (or Bongkote) Kongmalai and Bonkoch Konmalaï. Her first film role was in Tanit Jitnukul's historical epic about the battle of Bang Rajan. She studies at Ramkhamhaeng University.

Tak's major debut as a dramatic actress was in 2004's Ai-Fak, based on the S.E.A. Write Award-winning novel, Kham Phiphaksa (The Judgment), by Chart Korbjitti. She portrayed a mentally ill young woman who is married to a much older man. When her husband dies, her care is entrusted to the man's son, Fak, who is then ostracized by his fellow villagers because they believe he is having sexual relations with his stepmother.

In 2005, she was seen in Hit Man File, alongside Chatchai Plengpanich and Tom-Yum-Goong, which in 2006 was screened in the United States as The Protector. Also in 2006, she starred in the action comedy Chai Lai, about five female crimefighters, and then later in the year starred in the thriller, The Passion.

Controversies
In 2004 Tak was at the center of a controversy when nude photos of her, taken on the set of Ai-Fak, appeared on the Thai Internet forum, Pantip.com. Police were able to track the uploader down and the man was arrested. Tak asked that charges against the man be dropped after he issued a public apology, and she said she did so because the man hadn't smuggled the photos from the film set. A complaint was also filed against the film's production company for taking the photos.

In May 2012, Tak generated a wave of criticism when she mocked the death of Thai prisoner Ampon Tangnoppakul in her Facebook status updates, describing his death as karma; a 62-year-old grandfather, Ampon had been jailed for sending text messages critical of Queen Sirikit. After the negative fan reaction, Tak deleted the posts and apologized, but her royalist comments reflect deep prejudice in Thailand in favor of iconic views of the country's monarchy and the overpowering influence of the Thai military.

Filmography

Feature films
 Bang Rajan (2000) as Sa
 Khun pan (Legend of the Warlord) (2002) as Phimphilalai
 Ai-Fak (The Judgement) 2004 as Somsong
 The Story of the X-Circle (2004)
 Gin gwai 10 (The Eye 10) (2005)
 Sum muepuen (Hit Man File) (2005)
 Tom-Yum-Goong (The Protector) (2005) as Pla
Chai Lai (2006) as Rose
The Passion (2006)
Up to You (2006)
Tewada Ta Ja Teng (Theng's Angel) (2008)
Jan Dara The Beginning (2012) as Aunt Wat
Jan Dara The Finale (2013) as Aunt Wat

Television
 Sum Saban Nga	(1997)
 Look mae (1999)
 Niraj Sorng pop (2002)
 Sanae Jun	(2004)
 Lady Bar (French) (2007)
 Sao Noi	(2012)
 Sri Ayodhaya	(2017)
 Sri Ayodhaya 2	(2019)
 Mia Luang	(2021)
 Lai Kinnaree	(TBA)

References

External links

 
 Bongkoj Khongmalai at the Thai Film Database
 Bongkoj Khongmalai at Thailand Star
 Bongkoj Khongmalai at Amped Asia

1985 births
Living people
Bongkoj Khongmalai
Bongkoj Khongmalai
Bongkoj Khongmalai
Bongkoj Khongmalai
Bongkoj Khongmalai
Bongkoj Khongmalai
Place of birth missing (living people)